The Victoria Curling Classic Invitational, also known as the Bear Mountain Arena Curling Classic, was an annual curling bonspiel held at Victoria, British Columbia. It was part of the World Curling Tour. The bonspiel was begun in 2006 and had only a men's tournament until 2010 when a women's tournament was introduced.

The event was last held in 2013 for men and 2012 for women.

Past champions
The past champions for the Victoria Curling Classic Invitational are as follows.

Men

Women

References

External links
Victoria Curling Classic Home Page

Former World Curling Tour events
Sports competitions in Victoria, British Columbia
Curling in British Columbia
2006 establishments in British Columbia
2013 disestablishments in British Columbia
Recurring sporting events established in 2006
Recurring sporting events disestablished in 2013